General elections were held in Zanzibar on 1 June 1961, following the inconclusive elections in January. One further constituency, Mtambile, was created on the island of Pemba, with the hope that this would break the deadlock. The Zanzibar Nationalist Party and the Afro-Shirazi Party both won ten seats, despite the fact that the ASP had won just over 50% of the votes and the ZNP only 35%. The other three seats were won by the Zanzibar and Pemba People's Party three. The ZNP and ZPPP formed a coalition government.

Of the 93,918 registered voters, 90,595 voted, giving a turnout of 96.5%.

Results

References

Zanzibar
Elections in Tanzania
1961 in Zanzibar
Politics of Zanzibar